Lac La Biche is a large lake in north-central Alberta, Canada. It is located along the Northern Woods and Water Route, 95 km east of Athabasca.

Etymology

The indigenous peoples of the area refer to the lake as Elk Lake. Since the lake shares its name with the town, locals often use the redundant name "Lac La Biche Lake".

Hydrography
Owl River flows into the lake, and its waters are drained through the La Biche River and into the Athabasca River, placing it in the basin that flows to the Arctic Ocean. Just to the south is Beaver Lake which drains into Hudson Bay.

Settlements
The former town and population centre of Lac La Biche is on the southern shore of the lake. The communities of Plamondon, Barnegat and Owl River are also located around Lac La Biche.

Recreation
Sir Winston Churchill Provincial Park is on an island of the lake.

References

Lac La Biche County
Lakes of Alberta